Health in the State of Palestine should be addressed by the healthcare system in the State of Palestine. There are problems arising from difficulty of access, water scarcity while burden of non-communicable diseases in Palestine is high; the problems are compounded in Gaza.

Obesity
According to the World Health Organization, obesity affects 26.8% of the Palestinian population (23.3% males, 30.8% females). This is mostly due to decreased physical activity and greater than necessary food consumption, particularly with an increase in energy coming from fat. Two other factors are smoking and urbanization. In addition, "leisure-time physical activity is not a common concept in the Palestinian context, especially for rural women, where lack of sex-segregated facilities and cultural norms are prohibitive factors." Women in urban areas face similar cultural restrictions.

However, a study of Gazan mothers between the ages of 18-50, published in 2014, concluded the obesity rates ranged between 57%-67.5% depending on where they lived.  This study reflected another study published in 2009 (referenced therein) that determined the obesity rate of Palestinian men at 58.7% and Palestinian women at 71.3%.

Lack of clean water

Due to widespread illegal well drilling, Gaza’s sole aquifer has been over-pumped for years, resulting in the salinization of much of its water.  A 2009 assessment of a sample of 180 Gazan wells demonstrated that over 90 percent of them possessed chloride concentrations that were four times greater than the maximum amount suggested by the WHO. Gaza’s water supply has further been contaminated by waste water containing nitrate and pesticides, owing to a deficiency in Gazan waste water treatment capacity. A UN Environment Programme assessment of a sampling of Gazan wells demonstrated that nitrate levels in the drinking water exceeded the maximum amount suggested by the WHO by sixfold. Gaza’s waste systems are unable to effectively purify sewerage due to a scarcity of fuel and construction materials engendered by the ongoing embargo. Given their limited options, Gazans resort to drinking water deemed hazardous by the WHO for its high concentrations of salt, nitrate and other pesticides. The PNA’s Water Authority approximates that 25% of illnesses in Gaza are either directly or indirectly caused by unclean water. 

In the West Bank, only 69% of the towns are reached by a water network. Of these, less than half enjoy a constant supply of water without disruption. As in Gaza, waste water is a key pollutant in the West Bank as roughly 90% of Palestinian waste water there goes unprocessed, leaving much of the water supply contaminated. Human rights groups point to an aging water infrastructure and the inequitable division of water resources between Israeli settlers and Palestinians as the principal causes of water problems.
On average, each person in Gaza consumes 91 liters of water per day, which is lower than the 100 liter minimum the WHO regards as necessary to meet baseline health needs. Water consumption in the West Bank averages to only about 73 liters per day per capita, lower than in Gaza because illegal drilling is not as prevalent.

References